Caprivi is an unincorporated community located in North Middleton Township, Cumberland County, Pennsylvania, United States. Situated on Pennsylvania Route 74 north of Carlisle, the community is an agricultural enclave.

References

Unincorporated communities in Cumberland County, Pennsylvania
Unincorporated communities in Pennsylvania